It's All Over may refer to:
 "It's All Over" (Johnny Cash song), 1976
 "It's All Over" (The Everly Brothers song), 1965
 "It's All Over" (David Houston and Tammy Wynette song), 1968
 "It's All Over" (Blue System & Dionne Warwick song), 1991
 "It's All Over", a song by Three Days Grace from the album One-X